The 2018–19 Liga Nacional de Honduras season was the 53rd edition of the Liga Nacional de Honduras, the top football league in Honduras, since its establishment in 1965.  The tournament started in July 2018 and ended in June 2019.  The season was divided into two halves (Apertura and Clausura), each crowning one champion.  F.C. Motagua as winners of both tournaments, qualified to the 2019 CONCACAF League as HON1.  Club Deportivo Olimpia as runner-ups and C.D. Marathón as the team with the third best record, also qualified to international contention for next season.

2018–19 teams

A total of 10 teams will contest the tournament, including 9 sides from the 2017–18 season plus C.D. Real de Minas, promoted from the 2017–18 Liga de Ascenso.

 Real de Minas changed its name from Infop RNP to Club Deportivo Real de Minas.
 C.D. Real de Minas will use Danlí and Siguatepeque as alternate venues.
 Lobos UPNFM will use Choluteca as alternate venue.
 Club Deportivo Olimpia used San Pedro Sula as alternate venue for one game.

Managerial changes

Apertura
The Apertura tournament was the first half of the 2018–19 season which run from 28 July to 16 December 2018.  The schedule of the Apertura was released on 13 July.  F.C. Motagua finished at the top of the standings for their first time since 2010.  Meanwhile, Lobos UPNFM reached their best regular season performance finishing third.  C.D. Real de Minas finished last in their first league appearance.  Club Deportivo Olimpia eliminated Real C.D. España and qualified to their first final series since  2016.  Motagua, their rivals on the other side, qualified to their fifth consecutive final.  With a 2–1 aggregate score, Motagua conquered their 16th national title.

Regular season

Standings

Results

Playoffs

Results

Clausura
The Clausura tournament was the second half of the 2018–19 season which ran from January to June 2019.  The schedule was released on 20 December 2018.  Club Deportivo Olimpia finished on top of the standings for the first time since 2017.  Lobos UPNFM made history in the play-offs stage after beating Real C.D. España and qualifying to their first ever semifinal.  Just as it happened in the Apertura tournament, F.C. Motagua defeated their city rivals in the final series and conquered their 17th national title.

Regular season

Standings

Results

Playoffs

Results

Top goalscorers
The top scorer was determined by the addition of goals of both Apertura and Clausura tournaments in all their phases.

 As of 2 June 2019

 24 goals:

  Jerry Bengtson (Olimpia)

 21 goals:

  Jorge Benguché (UPNFM / Olimpia)
  Roberto Moreira (Motagua)

 20 goals:

  Justin Arboleda (Marathón)

 16 goals:

  Carlos Lanza (Juticalpa)

 15 goals:

  Yerson Gutiérrez (Honduras Progreso)

 10 goals:

  Franco Güity (Juticalpa / UPNFM)
  Frelys López (Honduras Progreso)
  Kevin López (Motagua)

 9 goals:

  Darixon Vuelto (Real España)
  Ángel Tejeda (Real España)
  Carlos Bernárdez (Vida)
  Óscar Salas (Olimpia / Juticalpa)
  Kilmar Peña (UPNFM)

 8 goals:

  Rubilio Castillo (Motagua)
  Yaudel Lahera (Marathón)
  Jhow Benavídez (Real España)
  Rundell Winchester (Platense)
  Erick Andino (Motagua)
  Carlos Discua (Marathón)
  Iván López (Real España)

 7 goals:

  Joshua Nieto (Platense)
  Javier Estupiñán (Motagua / Juticalpa)
  Marcelo Estigarribia (Motagua)

 6 goals:

  Rony Martínez (Olimpia / Real España)
  Juan Delgado (Honduras Progreso)
  Árnold Meléndez (UPNFM)

 5 goals:

  Jeancarlo Vargas (Platense)
  Israel Silva (Real de Minas)
  Carlo Costly (Olimpia / Marathón)
  Mario Martínez (Real España)
  Bryan Johnson (Marathón)
  Kervin Arriaga (Platense)
  Eddie Hernández (Vida)
  Juan Mejía (Real de Minas)

 4 goals:

  Alexander Aguilar (Platense)
  Diego Reyes (Olimpia / Platense)
  Gerson Rodas (Platense)
  José Tobías (H. Progreso / R. España)
  Johnny Leverón (Real España)
  Jesús Canales (Vida)
  Jesse Moncada (Real de Minas)
  Darwin Andino (Real de Minas)
  Marcelo Pereira (Motagua)

 3 goals:

  José Pinto (UPNFM)
  Ronald Montoya (UPNFM)
  James Cabezas (Juticalpa)
  Marvin Cálix (UPNFM)
  Júnior Lacayo (Olimpia)
  Michael Osorio (Vida / UPNFM)
  Foslyn Grant (Vida)
  Víctor Moncada (Juticalpa / UPNFM)
  Rembrandt Flores (Real de Minas)
  Elmer Güity (Olimpia)
  Aldo Oviedo (Real de Minas)
  Edwin Solano (Marathón)
  Henry Romero (Marathón)

 2 goals:

  Édgar Álvarez (Platense)
  Moisés López (Real de Minas)
  Miguel Flores (Vida)
  Samuel Córdova (Marathón)
  Óscar Padilla (Real de Minas)
  Jerrel Britto (Platense)
  Cholby Martínez (Vida)
  Brayan Velásquez (Olimpia)
  Kevin Álvarez (Olimpia)
  Júnior Padilla (UPNFM)
  Juan Bolaños (Platense)
  Walter Ramos (Honduras Progreso)
  Pedro Mencía (Platense)
  Nissi Sauceda (UPNFM)
  José Reyes (Olimpia)
  Luis Lobo (Platense / Juticalpa)
  Edwin Rodríguez (Olimpia)
  Jorge Álvarez (UPNFM / Olimpia)
  Wilmer Crisanto (Motagua)
  Diego Rodríguez (Real de Minas)
  Marlon Ramírez (Marathón)
  Erick Peña (Honduras Progreso)
  Jairo Puerto (Real España)
  Nelson Muñoz (Real de Minas)
  Matías Galvaliz (Motagua)
  Juan Montes (Motagua)
  Ever Alvarado (Olimpia)

 1 goal:

  Clinton Arzú (Honduras Progreso)
  Maylor Núñez (Juticalpa)
  Maximiliano Callorda (Real España)
  Carlos Mejía (Vida)
  Christian Martínez (UPNFM)
  Dábirson Castillo (Olimpia)
  Gétsel Montes (Real España)
  Jorge Claros (Real España)
  Lázaro Yánez (UPNFM)
  Román Valencia (Honduras Progreso)
  Franklyn Morales (Honduras Progreso)
  Marco Vega (Motagua)
  Brayan Acosta (Real de Minas)
  Álex Corrales (Real de Minas)
  Carlos Róchez (Marathón)
  Frédixon Elvir (Real de Minas)
  Jerry Palacios (Real de Minas)
  Luís Palma (Vida)
  Marvin Bernárdez (Vida)
  Richard Martínez (Real de Minas)
  Julián Galo (Real de Minas)
  Denis Meléndez (Vida)
  Elder Torres (Vida)
  Sergio Peña (Motagua)
  Walter Martínez (Motagua)
  Javier Portillo (Vida)
  César Oseguera (Real España)
  Denil Maldonado (Motagua)
  Luís Castro (Platense)
  Bayron Méndez (Juticalpa)
  Aldo Fajardo (Platense)
  Josué Villafranca (Motagua)
  Brayan Martínez (Marathón)
  Dylan Andrade (Honduras Progreso)
  Jorge Cardona (Honduras Progreso)
  Henry Ayala (Juticalpa)
  Luís Guzmán (Real de Minas)
  Ian Osorio (UPNFM)
  Bryan Bernárdez (Marathón)
  Emiliano Bonfigli (Olimpia)
  Esdras Padilla (Vida)
  Milton Castro (Honduras Progreso)
  Allans Vargas (Real España)
  German Mejía (Olimpia)
  Edgar Vásquez (UPNFM)
  Leandro Sosa (Olimpia)
  Alfredo Mejía (Real España)
  Kevin Maradiaga (Real de Minas)
  Jeffri Flores (Platense)
  Francisco Techera (Juticalpa)
  Marvin Barrios (Juticalpa)
  Óscar García (Real de Minas)
  Caue Fernandes (Marathón)
  Jeffry Miranda (Marathón)
  Devron García (Vida)
  Denis Lagos (UPNFM)
  Jairo Róchez (UPNFM)
  Erlin Gutiérrez (Honduras Progreso)
  José García (Real de Minas)
  Óliver Morazán (Juticalpa)
  Deybi Flores (Olimpia)

 1 own-goal:

  Brayan Acosta (Real de Minas)
  José Murillo (Juticalpa)
  Luis González (Honduras Progreso)
  Wilfredo Barahona (Juticalpa)
  Esdras Padilla (Real de Minas)
  Luís Castro (Platense)
  Juan Montes (Motagua)
  Martín Bonjour (Olimpia)
  Walter Ramos (Honduras Progreso)
  Marcelo Pereira (Motagua)

Aggregate table
Relegation was determined by the aggregated table of both Apertura and Clausura tournaments.  After 36 rounds, C.D. Real de Minas, Juticalpa F.C. and C.D. Honduras Progreso finished with 31 points each, with the goal difference being irrelevant.  All three teams had to play a one round-robin playoff to determine the team to be relegated.  It was only the second time in league's history that three teams were involved in a relegation triangular, the first one being held back in 1989.

Relegation playoffs

Controversies
 Right off the start of the season, week 1 was involved with controversy.  Platense F.C. accused F.C. Motagua for instructing the ball boys of hiding and holding the sideline balls in the last minutes of play, making it difficult to resume the game when the match ball went out of play.  Motagua was later fined for this action.  That same day, in San Pedro Sula, C.D. Marathón requested C.D.S. Vida players to pay tribute to the club with El Pasillo, (the act of acknowledging the winners of the previous season), a tradition which is very popular in Spain, but not in Honduras.  The Vida footballers strongly rejected the request.  One week later, Vida simulated the Pasillo action after scoring a goal against Juticalpa F.C., a clear sign of mockery.
 After a 1–1 draw between C.D. Marathón and Club Deportivo Olimpia in the Clásico Nacional on week 3, a very irritated Marathón's coach Héctor Vargas, criticized the referee's performance and insinuated Olimpia's intervention at halftime by calling the referees to fix the match.  Vargas also stated that his team with few resources is fighting on all fronts, and others with greater investments made a fool of themselves at international competitions; a clear dart to Real C.D. España who were eliminated from the 2018 CONCACAF League a few days earlier.  Olimpia's manager, Nahúm Espinoza decided not to comment.  However, Real España's Martín García expressed that Vargas is a very harmful person and his comments only reflect cowardice.  Vargas replied back and called García a fat man.  Vargas later announced that he will keep silent for 90 days; however, the Northern Discipline Commission cited Vargas to testify for violating discriminatory codes.  He was suspended for three games.
 On week 5, Real C.D. España faced C.D. Marathón in the Clásico Sampedrano.  In the pre-match, the game was already heated.  Real España as hosts, announced that only people dressed with the home team colors would be allowed to access the stadium.  The game elapsed with normalcy until Real España missed a penalty kick, which provoked the fury of the local crowd.  A few fans invaded the pitch but were easily controlled by the police.  A few minutes before the end, Marathón's keeper Dénovan Torres hit one of the sideline ball boys.  This action triggered an energetic response from the Real España's subs which were warming up nearby.  Torres and the entire Marathón's technical staff were expelled from the game.  Some Marathón fans, including women, were beaten in the stands by their counterparts.  Marathón requested the league the closure of the venue and Real España sued Torres for his actions.  These and many other sanctions were imposed by the league.
 On 28 August 2018, the Central Discipline Regional Commission ruled in favor of C.D. Marathón awarding them a 3–0 victory over Juticalpa F.C. as a result of Juticalpa fielding defender Carlos Palacios on week 4.  Palacios was ineligible to play due to his misconduct on the previous game against C.D. Honduras Progreso.  Consequently, Marathón submitted the complaint and was granted the win.  The original score ended in a 1–1 tie; therefore Marathón was awarded two points and Juticalpa was deducted one.
 Real C.D. España's player Ángel Tejeda was suspended for six games after spitting a fan during the Clásico Sampedrano against C.D. Marathón on week 14.  Former Real España's president Mateo Yibrín annotated on his Twitter account that the Discipline Commission are "social misfits".
 Through Jorge Pineda (assistant for Héctor Vargas), C.D. Marathón announced their intention to protest the match against F.C. Motagua on week 7.  This game, which ended 1–1 was postponed for several weeks.  Marathón is alleging that Motagua's players Omar Elvir and Wilmer Crisanto were lined up in the reserves encounter a month prior.  Marathón had already protested the game against Juticalpa F.C. on week 4 with success.
 The Apertura's final series between F.C. Motagua and Club Deportivo Olimpia were involved in controversies from start to finish.  Before the first leg, the board of directors of Motagua expressed their discomfort for the designation of referee Héctor Rodríguez for the first leg, claiming they have felt harmed in previous games due to his controversial decisions against the club.  Rodríguez did finally refereed the game which was ironically criticized by Olimpia.  Olimpia's coach Manuel Keosseián said in an interview he was not "a weepy", but contradictory, he called for a press conference the following day where he expressed his reasons why they lost in the first game, mostly blaming the referees.  Olimpia's defender Jonathan Paz was ejected from the first leg due to two successive yellow cards.  The Discipline Commission, presided by Allan Pineda, a well known Olimpia supporter, called for a meeting and determined that Paz was severally penalized by the refs and nullified one of the bookings, enabling the defender to take part in the return leg.  The second match evolved with normality until the final whistle, as Motagua were celebrating their victory, Olimpia's coach Keosseián stroked a punch to one of Motagua's fan entertainer.
 On 14 March 2019, a very peculiar incident happened in the Clásico Nacional between Club Deportivo Olimpia and C.D. Marathón, as both teams goalkeepers were ejected from the match due to violent conduct.  Both managers had already burnt all their substitutions; therefore, in the last few minutes of the game two outfield players had to cover the goalies.
 In the early morning of 7 April 2019, C.D. Marathón's goalkeeper Dénovan Torres was arrested due to domestic violence.

References

External links
 LNP Official

Liga Nacional de Fútbol Profesional de Honduras seasons
Liga Nacional
Honduras